Malta selected their Junior Eurovision Song Contest 2014 entry through an internal selection like they did the previous year. On 20 April 2014 it was revealed that Federica Falzon would represent Malta in the contest. It was announced on 12 September 2014 that her song would be called "Diamonds".

Internal selection
After winning the Junior Eurovision Song Contest 2013 with the internally selected Gaia Cauchi, the Maltese broadcaster PBS decided to internally select their 2014 artist as well. On 20 April 2014, PBS revealed that 11-year-old Federica Falzon would represent Malta. Falzon is a student of Gillian Attard, who also was the vocal coach of Cauchi. On 22 August 2014, it was revealed that her song was written by Attard, Elton Zarb, and Matt Muxu Mercieca who were all members of the writing team that wrote the winning song "The Start". The title of the song was revealed to be "Diamonds" on 12 September 2014.

At Junior Eurovision 
At the running order draw which took place on 9 November 2014, host country Malta were drawn to perform fifteenth on 15 November 2014, following  and preceding .

Voting

Detailed voting results
The following members comprised the Maltese jury:
 Jolene Micallef
 Paul Abela
 Chrysander Agius
 Amber Bondin
 Corazon Mizzi

Notes

References

Junior Eurovision Song Contest
Malta
2014